Travanca is a former civil parish in the municipality of Santa Maria da Feira, Portugal. In 2013, the parish merged into the new parish Santa Maria da Feira, Travanca, Sanfins e Espargo. It has a population of 2,201 inhabitants and a total area of 5.72 km2.

References

Former parishes of Santa Maria da Feira